Sebastian Steblecki (born 16 January 1992) is a Polish professional footballer who plays as a midfielder for Chrobry Głogów.

Club career
In January 2018 he moved to Chojniczanka Chojnice.

Personal life
His father, Roman Steblecki, was an ice hockey player who played at the 1988 Winter Olympics.

External links

References

1992 births
Footballers from Kraków
Living people
Polish footballers
Poland under-21 international footballers
Association football midfielders
MKS Cracovia (football) players
SC Cambuur players
Górnik Zabrze players
Chojniczanka Chojnice players
GKS Tychy players
Chrobry Głogów players
Ekstraklasa players
I liga players
Eredivisie players
Polish expatriate footballers
Expatriate footballers in the Netherlands
Polish expatriate sportspeople in the Netherlands